Adventures Into the Unknown was an American comic-book magazine series best known as the medium's first ongoing horror-comics title. Published by the American Comics Group, initially under the imprint B&I Publishing, it ran 174 issues (cover-dated Fall 1948 - Aug. 1967).

The first issue, written by Frank Belknap Long with art by Fred Guardineer and others, featured the stories "The Werewolf Stalks", "The Living Ghost", "It Walked By Night" and "Haunted House". It also included a seven-page abridged adaptation of Horace Walpole's seminal gothic novel The Castle of Otranto, by an unknown writer and artist, Al Ulmer.

Collected editions
 ACG Collected Works: Adventures into the Unknown, collects issues 1–83 (PS Artbooks)
 Volume 1 (2011) through Volume 21 (2020)
 Dark Horse Archives: Adventures into the Unknown!, collects issues 1–16 (Dark Horse)
 Volume 1 (2012) through Volume 4 (2015)

See also

 Horror comics

References

External links
 Adventures Into the Unknown covers

1948 comics debuts
1967 comics endings
Comics magazines published in the United States
Defunct American comics
Horror comics
Golden Age comics titles
Magazines established in 1948
Magazines disestablished in 1967
American Comics Group titles